Myru Avenue ( is a street in central Chernihiv. It starts from the southern outskirts of Chernihiv and Red Square. Extends north through the city to the city limits. Many streets and alleys adjoin the avenue. The beginning of the avenue passes through the center of Chernihiv, so there are many boutiques, several shopping centers, many cafes, restaurants, hotels "Ukraine" and "Gradetsky". In the area of visiting "Ukraine" Peace Avenue is transformed from Victory Avenue, another major highway in Chernihiv.

Description
The avenue is very wide in the center, 4 lanes in each direction, for any length (from "Ukraine" to ZAZ), equipped with wires for trolleybuses. In the central part of the city there are 2 parks on the avenues - the Alley of Heroes and the Central Park. From Hradetsky to the end - 2 lanes on each side. The beginning of the name was Lenin Street until 2021.

History
This street is first mentioned in documents of the XVIII century. Then it was called Lyubetska and stretched from Dytynets Park to Pyatnytsky Field (Red Square). The Statue of Lenin was located in the middle of Myru Avenue, near the Central Post Office and it was toppled on February 21, 2014, as part of the demolitions of the statues of Lenin in Ukraine. During the COVID-19 pandemic, synevo company placed a Lab center in Myru Ave 198-A.

Sights
Along the promenade's length are kiosks that sell newspapers and souvenirs, other kiosks selling flowers, street traders, performers, and pavement cafes and bars. Several notable sights are also located within the promenade, a fountain in Krasna Square and popular meeting point. From its origins from at the entrance of the city of Chernihiv along the Myru Avenue are historic buildings such as Catherine's Church, Dytynets Park, Krasna Square, the Chernihiv City Council, Shchors cinema, Hotel Desna
Opera and Drama Theatre, designed by Semyon Fridlin. You can also admire the Chernihiv Oblast Council, Church of the Archangel Michael.

 Catherine's Church
 Dytynets Park
 Chernihiv Philharmony
 Statue to the Chernobyl Disaster
 Krasna Square
 Shchors cinema
 Chernihiv City Council
 Chernihiv Governorate Zemstvo building
 Hotel Ukraina
 House of the Fire Society
 Cinema Druzhba
 Institute of Physical Therapy
 Chernihiv Oblast Council
 Korolenko Chernihiv Regional Universal Scientific Library
 Church of the Archangel Michael
 Chernihiv Arena

Transport
 Buses 1, 2, 2A, 3, 5, 7, 9, 10, 15, 17, 20, 22, 23, 24, 25, 27, 28, 29, 30, 31, 32, 33, 34, 35, 37 , 38, 39, 42,
 Trolleybuses 1, 2, 3, 4, 5, 6, 9, 10
 Minibuses 33

Buildings
In the future, the ZAZ plant and other small industrial enterprises will be opened.

 Bus. № 13-Educational and Scientific Institute of History, Ethnology and Law named after O.M. Lazarevsky; Severyan thought;
 Bus. № 32 - TV channel "Baby";  
 Bus. № 33 - Ukraine (hotel, Chernihiv);
 Bus. № 36 - Institute of Physical Therapy. Vorovsky, construction in 1912;
 Bus. № 40 - SSh №1;   
 Bus. № 41 - Noble and Peasant Land Bank, now Chernihiv Regional Universal Scientific Library named after VG Korolenko
 Bus. № 44 - Chernihiv City Hospital № 1;
 Bus. № 51 - Druzhba cinema;
 Bus. № 68 - Hradec Králové (hotel);
 Bus. № 74 - Poltoratsky Doctors' House (historical monument);
 Bus. № 100 - Church of the Archangel Michael MP (built in 2011);
 Bus. № 116 - Rashevsky's house (historical monument; actually disappeared);
 Bus. № 137-School-college №11 
 Bus. № 207a - SSh №28
 Bus. № 207b - School №33
 Bus. № 211-Municipal special preventive institution "Chernihiv Regional Oncology Center"

Gallery

See also
List of streets and squares in Chernihiv

References

External links

Streets in Chernihiv